Rimosodaphnella solomonensis is a species of sea snail, a marine gastropod mollusk in the family Raphitomidae.

Description
The length of the shell reaches 11.6 mm.

Distribution
This marine species occurs off Papua New Guinea and the Solomon Islands.

References

External links
 Bonfitto, A.; Morassi, M. (2013). New Indo-Pacific species of Rimosodaphnella Cossmann, 1916 (Gastropoda: Conoidea): a genus of probable Tethyan origin. Molluscan Research. 33(4): 230-236.
 Gastropods.com: Rimosodaphnella solomonensis

solomonensis
Gastropods described in 2013